Originally, the Duchy of Chartres (duché de Chartres) was the comté de Chartres, a County. The title of comte de Chartres thus became duc de Chartres. This duchy–peerage was given by Louis XIV of France to his nephew, Philippe II d'Orléans, at his birth in 1674. Philippe II was the younger son and heir of the king's brother, Philippe de France, Duke of Orléans.

Carolingian Counts
 882-886 Hastein, Viking chieftain, beat Carloman II of France in 879, agreed to settle and received the County of Chartres. He sold it in 886 to finance an expedition during which he disappeared.

Hereditary Counts

House of Blois

The northern portion of the County of Blois, bordering on Normandy, was sometimes alienated as the County of Chartres, but the Counts of Blois who possessed it did not use a separate title for it.  In 1391, the death of the only son of Guy II, Count of Blois prompted him to sell the inheritance of the County of Blois to Louis of Valois, Duke of Orléans, merging the title into the royal dukedom.

960-975 Theobald I of Blois († 975), Count of Blois and Chartres, which he took in 960

 Married to Luitgarde of Vermandois

Theobold I was also known as  Theobald the Cheat, or Theobald the Old. He was given the nickname “the Cheat” fighting with his neighbours, among them the kings of France, the dukes of Normandy, and the church of Reims.

975-995 Odo I, Count of Blois, († 995), Count of Chartres, and Reims (982-995), son of the previous
 Married to Bertha of Burgundy

995-1004 Theobald II of Blois († 1004), Count of Blois, Chartres and Reims, the son of the previous

1004-1037 Odo II of Blois († 1037), Count of Blois, Chartres, Reims, Meaux and Troyes, brother of the previous
 Married first in 1003 to Mathilde de Normandie († 1006)
 Married second to Ermengearde of Auvergne

1037-1089 Theobald III, Count of Blois (1019 † 1089), Count of Blois, Chartres, Meaux and Troyes son of Eudes II and Ermengearde d'Auvergne
 Married first to Gersende of Maine
 Married second to Adele of Valois

1089-1102 Stephen II, Count of Blois († 1102), Count of Blois, Chartres and Meaux, son of Thibaut III and Gersende of Maine.
 Married to Adela of Normandy

1102-1151 Theobald II, Count of Champagne († 1152), Count of Blois, Chartres and Meaux, and then Count of Champagne in 1125, son of the former.
 Married in 1123 to Matilda of Carinthia († 1161)

1151-1191 Theobald V, Count of Blois († 1191), Count of Blois and Chartres, son of the former.
 Married first to Sibylle of Châteaurenard
 Married second in 1164 to Alix of France

1191-1205 Louis I, Count of Blois († 1205), Count of Blois and Chartres, son of the previous and Alix de France
 Married in 1184 to Catherine of Clermont

1205-1218 Theobald VI, Count of Blois († 1218), son of the previous
 Married first to Mahaut of Alençon
 Married second to Clemence des Roches

1218-1248 Isabelle († 1248), Countess of Chartres and castellan of Romorantin
 Married first to Sulpice III d'Amboise
 Married second to Jean II de Montmirail († 1244).

House of Amboise
1248-1256 Matilda of Amboise († 1256), Countess of Chartres
 Married to Richard II, Count of Beaumont, then to Jean II de Nesle

House of Blois-Châtillon 
 Theobald V, Count of Blois married his second wife in 1164 to Alix of France and father of:
 Margaret, Countess of Blois, married to Walter II of Avesnes, mother of:
 Mary, Countess of Blois († 1241), married to Hugues de Châtillon (v.1196 † 1248), Count of Saint-Pol, mother of:

 1256-1280 John I, Count of Blois († 1280), son of the previous
 Married 1254 to Alice of Brittany (1243-1288)

 1280-1286 Joan, Countess of Blois († 1292), daughter of the previous
 Married 1272 to Peter of France († 1284), Count of Alençon and Valois. In 1286, she sold the county of Chartres to Philip IV of France

Counts apanage

House of Valois
 1290-1302 and 1310-1325 Charles, Count of Valois, (1270 † 1325), Count of Valois, Alençon, Perche, Chartres, Anjou and Maine
 Married first to Margaret, Countess of Anjou and Maine (1273 † 1299)
 Married second to Catherine I, Latin Empress (1274 † 1308)
 Married third to Mahaut of Châtillon (1293 † 1358), cousin of Jeanne de Blois-Châtillon

 1302-1310 John of Valois (1302-1310), Count of Chartres, son of Charles of Valois and Catherine I

 1325-1328  (1318-1328), Count of Chartres, son of Charles of Valois and Mahaut of Châtillon

 1328-1346 Charles II of Alençon (1297 † 1346), Count of Alençon, Chartres, son of Charles of Valois and Margaret of Anjou

 1510-1528 Renée of France (1510 † 1574), Duchess of Chartres, daughter of Louis XII of France and Anne of Brittany, married to Ercole II d'Este, Duke of Ferrara

Duke of Chartres

After its revival and elevation, the title duc de Chartres was used by the House of Orléans, founded by Philippe de France, duc d'Orléans, and cadet branch of the  House of Bourbon.

Branch of Capetian de Valois 
Renée de France (1509 † 1575), Duchesse de Chartres, daughter of Louis XII and Anne Brittany, married to Hercules d'Este, Duke of Ferrara
Alfonso II d'Este, Duke of Ferrara, their son.

Fils de France 
1626-1660 Gaston, Duke of Orléans, (1608–1660) son of King Henri IV
1660-1674 Philippe I, Duke of Orléans, (1640–1701 ) son of King Louis XIII the Just

Branch of Capetian d'Orleans 
From 1674 until today, the title of Duke of Chartres is the eldest son of the Duke of Orleans

1674-1701 Philippe II, said "the Pious" (1674–1723) son of preceding;
1703-1723 Louis IV (1703–1752) son of the previous;
1725-1752 Louis Philippe I, Duke of Orléans, "the Fat" (1725–1785) son of preceding;
1752-1785 Louis Philippe II, Duke of Orléans (1747–1793) son of the previous waives his title in 1792 and takes the name of "Philippe Égalité";
1785-1793 Louis Philippe III, Duke of Orléans (1773–1850) son of preceding. Access to power in 1830 under the name of Louis-Philippe Ier;
1810-1830 Ferdinand-Philippe (1810–1842) son of preceding;
1840-1910 Robert, son of Ferdinand-Philippe and thus grandson of King Louis-Philippe of France.

After 1848
Since 1996 the title is held, as a courtesy title, by 

References

Counts and dukes of Chartres
House of Orléans
Orléans